Joe Rosario (born January 6, 1959) is an American actor, writer and director. His appearances in television series include Ed, Law & Order: Special Victims Unit, and The Sopranos. Rosario produced the short film Together. He received an award of excellence from the Accolade film festival and the New York International Film Festival award for comedy short film.

References

External links

1959 births
Living people
American male actors
Place of birth missing (living people)